Dawangzhuang Subdistrict is a subdistrict situated on the southwestern side of Hedong District, Tianjin. it shares border with Chunhua and Tangjiekou Subdistricts in its northeast, Dazhigu Subdistrict in its southeast, Xiawafang and Dayingmen Subdistricts in its south, as well as Xiaobailou and Guangfudao Subdistricts in its west. As of 2010, its total population was 65,614.

The subdistrict's name can be translated as "Great Wang's Villa".

History

Administrative divisions 
At the end of 2021, Dawangzhuang Subdistrict consisted of 13 communities. They are, by the order of their Administrative Division Codes:

Gallery

References 

Township-level divisions of Tianjin
Hedong District, Tianjin